Arena station is a light rail station in Downtown Salt Lake City, Utah, in the United States, served by the Blue Line and Green Line of the Utah Transit Authority's (UTA) TRAX system. The Blue Line has service from the Salt Lake Intermodal Hub in Downtown Salt Lake City to Draper. The Green Line has service from the Salt Lake City International Airport and to West Valley City via Downtown Salt Lake City.

Description 
The station is located at 301 West South Temple immediately north of the Vivint Smart Home Arena, with the island platform in the median of the street. The station opened on December 4, 1999, and was part of the first operating segment of the TRAX system. It is operated by the Utah Transit Authority. The station is included in the Free Fare Zone in Downtown Salt Lake City. Transportation patrons that both enter and exit bus or TRAX service within the Zone can ride at no charge. Unlike many TRAX stations, Arena does not have a Park and Ride lot.

History 
This station was originally the northern terminus of TRAX until April 27, 2008, when the extension to the Salt Lake Intermodal Hub (Salt Lake Central) opened  As of December 9, 2012 the Green Line was rerouted and Arena became the temporary northern terminus. With the opening of the airport extension on April 14, 2013, service continued on to the Salt Lake International Airport.

The station was closed during the 2002 Winter Olympics since it was in the Olympic Plaza. The countdown clock from the games still remains on the platform. It is in the shape of an arrowhead because of the Native American weapons that were unearthed during the construction of the station. Arena was previously called Delta Center, but when the name of the arena was changed to EnergySolutions Arena, the UTA Board of Trustees officially changed the station name to Arena in December 2006. "EnergySolutions" was not included in the name as the UTA Board decided to no longer allow corporate names on stations.

References 

TRAX (light rail) stations
Railway stations in the United States opened in 1999
Railway stations in Salt Lake City
1999 establishments in Utah